Brad Adkins (born 1973) is an American self-taught artist and curator. In 2002, Chas Bowie of The Portland Mercury declared Adkins "the poster boy of low-rent artwork.",  Also in 2002,  D.K. Row of The Oregonian listed Adkins as one of ten "artists you don't know, but should." Matthew Stadler of Nest and Clear Cut Press calls Adkins "an orchestrator of the quotidian", "whose interventions turn the everyday into art."

Adkins individual, collaborative, and curatorial work has been presented at The Art Gym,  Consolidated Works, Douglas F. Cooley Memorial Gallery, The Portland Art Museum, and PICA; and has been noted and featured in ARTnews, Artweek, Modern Painters, Punk Planet, and The Independent. His work is represented in Portland by PDX Contemporary Art. Between 2002 and 2004, Adkins curated a  print gallery and a quarterly broadside for The Oregon Review of the Arts. In 2004, Marriage Records published BIG RED, an audio CD that documents an afternoon conversation between Adkins and Curtis Knapp (founder of Marriage Records) on the subjects of performance, imitation, and close-up magic.

Between 2001 and 2004, he collaborated with Christopher Buckingham on multi-disciplinary projects and exhibitions under the name Charm Bracelet.

He was born in Kalispell, Montana and resides in Portland, Oregon.

References

1973 births
Pacific Northwest artists
People from Kalispell, Montana
Artists from Portland, Oregon
Living people